The 2011 Robert Morris Colonials football team represented Robert Morris University in the 2011 NCAA Division I FCS football season. The Colonials were led by 18th-year head coach Joe Walton and played their home games at Joe Walton Stadium. They are a member of the Northeast Conference. They finished the season 2–9, 2–6 in NEC play to finish in eighth place.

Schedule

References

Robert Morris
Robert Morris Colonials football seasons
Robert Morris Colonials football